Hotel Pulitzer is a five star luxury hotel in Amsterdam, located on the Prinsengracht and Keizersgracht. The hotel consists of 25 historic canal houses from the 17th and 18th century, merged into one and opened as a hotel in 1970 after several canal houses were bought by Howard Johnson's.

History
In 1614, the commissioners began the new fortification with the allocation of plots in the area situated between the Keizersgracht and the Prinsengracht and Reestraat. A number of canal houses in this area was built by the Technical Union. The garden houses on the Prinsengracht and empty warehouses were used as storage facilities for the Technical Union.

In 1970,  buildings were bought by hotel company Howard Johnson's, including  nine buildings on the Prinsengracht (numbers 315-331), the pavilion of the Saxen Pennsylvania House and the two houses on the Keizersgracht with 176 rooms. The kitchen and restaurant are in the three houses on the Reestraat. On June 1, 1970, the Howard Johnson Hotel officially opened. After several years the hotel was named after Herbert Pulitzer, the then owner of the hotel and the grandson of Joseph Pulitzer.

By the end of 1975, the Pulitzer Hotel had expanded with two buildings, adding twenty new rooms and apartments. Six years later, a building at Reestraat was added and later extended back later with eight buildings on the Keizersgracht. In the mid 1990s, Herbert Pulitzer sold the hotel to the Italian hotel chain CIGA. By the end of 1996 CIGA was acquired by ITT Sheraton. In 1997 Sheraton sold a 75 percent to Hospitality Europe Holding BV, a company specializing in the operation of international hotels in Europe. The Hotel Pulitzer was managed until 2015 by Starwood.

Between 1998 and 2000 there was a complete renovation of the hotel. In 2016, there was another renovation, reducing the number of rooms to 225.

Facilities
The Hotel Pulitzer has 225 rooms. All of the rooms are non-smoking, in compliance with legal obligations in Amsterdam. The hotel has nine conference rooms, and the salons and reception facilities can accommodate up to 500 people.
The hotel has its own canal boat, moored on the Prinsengracht canal outside the hotel.

References

Hotels in Amsterdam
Hotels established in 1970
Pulitzer family (newspapers)